Arizona's 1st Legislative District is one of 30 in the state, consisting of most of Yavapai County, along with a small section of Maricopa County. As of 2021 there are 51 precincts in the district, 35 in Yavapai and 16 in Maricopa, with a total registered voter population of 176,958. The district has an overall population of 231,829.

Political representation
The district is represented for the 2021–2022 Legislative Session in the State Senate by Karen Fann (R, Prescott) and in the House of Representatives by Judy Burges (R, Prescott) and Quang Nguyen (R, Prescott).

See also
 List of Arizona Legislative Districts
 Arizona State Legislature

References

Arizona legislative districts
Yavapai County, Arizona
Maricopa County, Arizona